Star Vijay (formerly Vijay TV) is an Indian Tamil language general entertainment pay television channel owned by The Walt Disney Company India. a wholly owned by The Walt Disney Company. Star Vijay changed hands several times before being partly acquired by the Star India in 2001. The channel telecasts Tamil language programmes such as serials, reality shows and Tamil films.

History
The channel was first launched by N. P. V. Ramasamy Udayar on 24 November 1994, as Golden Eagle Communication (GEC). United Breweries Group acquired the channel in 1995 and renamed it as Vijay TV. The UTV Group bought the controlling interest from United Breweries Group in 1999 for  million. In 2001, Star India took over the channel and rebranded it as Star Vijay. Star acquired 51 percent stake in Vijay TV with UTV holding the remaining 49 percent. In 2004, UTV Software Communications offloaded its entire 44 percent stake in Vijay TV to Star India for  ₹31 crores.

This channel, along with Star One, was launched in Hong Kong in 2007.

The High-Definition feed, Star Vijay HD, was launched on 29 May 2016.

On 25 August 2016, its sibling channel Star Vijay Super was launched, which airs non-stop films and legacy television shows and later got revamped into a full movie channel with a tagline "Dhool Cinema Dhinam Dhinam".

On 25 June 2017, Star Vijay revamped its logo and branding to match its sister channels under Star India with a tagline "Edhilum Pudhumai Tamizhin Perumai". Now the channel is owned by Disney Star Asianet (previously known as Asianet Star communications), a subsidiary of Disney Star that has control over the Malayalam, Kannada and Tamil language channels of the company.

On 4 October 2020, it launched a music channel named Star Vijay Music.

On 10 October 2022, Star Vijay Music was rebranded it as a youth oriented entertainment television channel named Star Vijay Takkar.

On 23 October 2022, Star Vijay revamped it's on-air graphics with a brand new tagline "Maarum Pudhumai Maaradha Perumai".

Logos

Programming

Sister channels

Current channels

Star Vijay Super 

Star Vijay Super (formerly Vijay Super) is an Indian Tamil language movie pay television channel owned by The Walt Disney Company India. a wholly owned by The Walt Disney Company.

Star Vijay Takkar 

Star Vijay Takkar is an Indian Tamil youth oriented entertainment pay television channel  owned by The Walt Disney Company India. a wholly owned by The Walt Disney Company India. that has been launched on 10 October 2022 replacing former channel Star Vijay Music.

Former channel

Star Vijay Music 

Star Vijay Music  is a 24×7 Indian Tamil language music pay television channel owned by The Walt Disney Company India. a wholly owned by The Walt Disney Company. that was launched on 4 October 2020 during the grand launch of Bigg Boss season 4 by Kamal Haasan. The channel was replaced and rebranded as Star Vijay Takkar from 10 October 2022 onwards.

Reception
When Star India took over the channel from UTV Communications, the channel's revenue, shares and advertising rates increased. A revamp in 2017 brought with it a new logo and the launch of Bigg Boss Tamil Season 1, after which the audience share of the channel—which had been 10%-15%—increased by 10%, being the second most-watched Tamil television channel.

In week 48 of 2020, Star Vijay became the most watched Tamil GEC in prime time for the first time while being the second most watched Tamil GEC overall after Sun TV. In week 50, it garnered its highest viewership ratings of 7,14,002 AMAs (average minute audience (in hundreds)) being the fifth most watched Indian television channel.

References

External links 
 

Tamil-language television channels
Television channels and stations established in 1994
Television stations in Chennai
Disney Star